Southampton is a civil parish in York County, New Brunswick, Canada.

For governance purposes it is divided between the town of Nackawic, the village of Millville, and the local service district of the parish of Southampton, all of which are members of Regional Service Commission 11 (RSC11).

Origin of name
When Carleton County was erected in 1832 the new county line went through Northampton Parish. The next year the part of Northampton south of the line was erected as Southampton.

History
Southampton was erected in 1833 from the part of Northampton Parish that was southeast of the Carleton County line.

In 1834 the county line was altered to run along grant lines, adding territory to Southampton.

In 1865 the boundary with Queensbury Parish was altered, removing territory east of the East Branch Nackawic Stream.

Boundaries
Southampton Parish is bounded:

 on the northeast beginning on the Carleton County line about 600 metres northeasterly of Route 104, on the prolongation the central line of a two-lot grant to Jonathan Williams on the Saint John River, then running southeasterly along the prolongation to the Burnt Lake Branch;
 on the southeast by a line running down the Burnt Lake Branch and the East Branch Nackawic Stream to the northeastern line of a grant to John Morehouse, about 2.4 kilometres easterly of the junction of Caverhill Siding Road with Route 605, then southeasterly about 1.2 kilometres and southwesterly about 275 metres  along the Morehouse grant to the prolongation of the southeastern line of a grant to William Dobie, then southeasterly about 675 metres along the Dobie grant to the prolongation of the southeastern line of a large grant to Captain Joseph Cunliffe, then southwesterly along the Cunliffe grant, striking the Saint John River about 150 metres downstream of the mouth of Quigg Brook, then up the Saint John;
 on the south by the Saint John River;
 on the northwest by the Carleton County line.

Communities
Communities at least partly within the parish.

  Bates Settlement
  Bull Lake
  Campbell Settlement
  Caverhill
 Central Waterville
  Clarkville
 County Line
 East Waterville
  Hainesville
  Hartfield
 Hawkins Corner
  Maple Ridge
 Maplewood
 Middle Southampton
  Millville
 Nackawic
 Nortondale
  Pinder
 Ritchie
  Rossville
 South Waterville
  Southampton
 Southampton Junction
  Temperance Vale
 Temple
 Upper Southampton
 West Waterville
 Woodman
 Woodstock Road

Bodies of water
Bodies of water at least partly within the parish.

  Saint John River
 Meductic Reach
 Pokiok Reach
 Burnt Lake Branch
 Nackawic Stream
 Bulls Creek
 Farnhams Creek
 Gibson Creek
 Greer Creek
  Bull Lake
  Mactaquac Lake
 more than a half-dozen other officially named lakes

Other notable places
Parks, historic sites, and other noteworthy places at least partly within the parish.
 Ayers Lake Stream Protected Natural Area
 Becaguimec Wildlife Management Area
 Carr Falls Brook Protected Natural Area
 Greer Creek Protected Natural Area
 Woodman Protected Natural Area

Demographics
Parish population total does not include Millville and Nackawic

Population
Population trend

Language
Mother tongue (2016)

See also
List of parishes in New Brunswick

Notes

References

Parishes of York County, New Brunswick